Once Upon a Time/The Singles is Siouxsie and the Banshees's 1981 compilation album featuring the band's UK single releases to date. The album featured several songs that had been released as singles yet had not appeared on any of the Banshees' four albums. Once Upon a Time/The Singles spent twenty six weeks in the UK albums chart. The sleeve was designed by Stylorouge.

In 2020, a limited edition of the album was reissued on clear vinyl LP with an extra poster and print included.

Video compilation
A tie-in VHS video was released in the UK the same year on PolyGram's Spectrum label (catalogue number 7915062). Running for 30 minutes, it featured the videos to the eight singles, but replaced "Mirage" and "Love in a Void" with "Red Light" from the "Kaleidoscope" album.

Critical reception
AllMusic's Steve Huey called the compilation "a cohesive and essential overview of the band's edgy, influential peak". He added that despite the group's "challenging" music, "it's also accessible enough for eight of these singles to have charted in the British Top 50." In 1982, Mark Tremblay of the Calgary Herald wrote that "only 'Playground Twist' really excels from the first side", which features the band's singles prior to 1980. Tremblay said "Side two is more polished, less abrasive and generally has better rhythmic drive." 
In 2002, Q Magazine named Once Upon a Time/The Singles the 7th Greatest Album of All-Time by a Female Artist. 
In 2012, Rolling Stone ranked the album 44th on its "Women Who Rock: The 50 Greatest Albums of All Time" list.

Track listing
 "Hong Kong Garden" (Siouxsie Sioux, Steven Severin, John McKay and Kenny Morris)
 "Mirage" (Siouxsie, Severin, McKay and Morris)
 "The Staircase (Mystery)" (Siouxsie, Severin, McKay and Morris)
 "Playground Twist" (Siouxsie, Severin, McKay and Morris)
 "Love in a Void" (Siouxsie, Severin, Peter Fenton and Morris)
 "Happy House" (Siouxsie and Severin)
 "Christine" (Siouxsie and Severin)
 "Israel" (Siouxsie, Severin, Budgie and John McGeoch)
 "Spellbound" (Siouxsie, Severin, Budgie and McGeoch)
 "Arabian Knights" (Siouxsie, Severin, Budgie and McGeoch)

Charts

Certifications

References

1981 greatest hits albums
Albums produced by Steve Lillywhite
Siouxsie and the Banshees compilation albums
Polydor Records compilation albums
Geffen Records compilation albums